Joseph Bolkcom (born July 29, 1956) is a member of the Iowa Senate. A Democrat, he was first elected to the Senate in 1998. He represents the 43rd District of the General Assembly, which includes most of metropolitan Iowa City.

Bolkcom currently serves on several committees in the Iowa Senate.

Bolkcom was reelected in 2002. In the 2006 General Election he won 78% of the vote (14,816 votes). His only opponent was Jay Christensen-Szalanski, an independent, who received 22%.

Bolkcom graduated from Saint Ambrose University in Davenport in 1983. He went on to earn a master's degree in Public Affairs from the University of Iowa. He served from 1993 to 1998 on the Johnson County Board of Supervisors. Prior to that he worked for Johnson County Health Department, Senior Advocates, Inc., and Senior Education, Inc. He is a member of the Iowa Civil Liberties Union, and the Iowa Chapter of the Sierra Club.

References

External links
Senator Joe Bolkcom official Iowa Legislature site
Senator Joe Bolkcom official Iowa General Assembly site
State Senator Joe Bolkcom official constituency site
 Iowa State Senator Joe Bolkcom official campaign site
 
Senator Joe Bolkcom's Photo Gallery at Picasa

Democratic Party Iowa state senators
1956 births
Living people
St. Ambrose University alumni
University of Iowa alumni
People from Bloomington, Minnesota
Politicians from Iowa City, Iowa
County supervisors in Iowa
21st-century American politicians